The 1982–83 Indiana Hoosiers men's basketball team represented Indiana University. Their head coach was Bobby Knight, who was in his 12th year. The team played its home games in Assembly Hall in Bloomington, Indiana, and was a member of the Big Ten Conference.

The Hoosiers finished the regular season with an overall record of 24–6 and a conference record of 13–5, finishing 1st in the Big Ten Conference. As Big Ten Conference Champions, IU was invited to participate in the 1983 NCAA Tournament as a 2-seed. The Hoosiers advanced to the Sweet Sixteen, which was their first since 1981, but they lost to the 3-seed Kentucky Wildcats.

The five banners in the south end of Assembly Hall honor IU's NCAA champions, and the banners in the north end honor various other accomplishments: NIT titles, Final Four appearances, and the undefeated regular season of 1976. While there now are two banners listing the years of IU's 21 Big Ten titles, those were not present during Bobby Knight's tenure. Before 2000, the only Big Ten title banner that was hung honored the 1983 team, which Knight ordered as a tribute to the fans. He credited the fans with inspiring the team to win its final three home games over Purdue, Illinois, and Ohio State, to seal the conference title after losing Ted Kitchel to injury. While IU survived the loss of Kitchel in the regular season, during the NCAA tournament, his absence was felt; IU lost to Kentucky despite strong performances by Randy Wittman and Uwe Blab.

Roster

Schedule/Results

|-
!colspan=8| Regular Season
|-

|-
!colspan=8| NCAA tournament

References

Indiana Hoosiers men's basketball seasons
Indiana
Indiana
1982 in sports in Indiana
1983 in sports in Indiana